Merja Rantanen (born December 7, 1980) is a Finnish orienteering competitor. She received a silver medal in the middle distance at the 2008 European Orienteering Championships in Ventspils. She also participated on the Finnish team (with Katri Lindeqvist and Minna Kauppi) that achieved a bronze medal in the championship relay.

See also
 Finnish orienteers
 List of orienteers
 List of orienteering events

References

External links
 

1980 births
Living people
Finnish orienteers
Female orienteers
Foot orienteers
World Orienteering Championships medalists
Competitors at the 2005 World Games